is a Japanese tarento, actress, and former gravure idol. Marutaka is represented with Avex Vanguard. Her husband is footballer Yoichiro Kakitani.

Filmography

Variety

TV dramas

Advertisements

Films

Stage

Internet dramas

Internet

Arcade games

Works
 DVD

 CD

micro SD

 Magazines

 Songs

References

External links
 – Avex Vanguard  
 – Ameba Blog (31 July 2009 –) 
 (3 Jun 2010 – ) 
 – G9 (Kari) 

Japanese gravure idols
Japanese television personalities
21st-century Japanese actresses
Avex Group talents
People from Tokyo
1990 births
Living people
Models from Tokyo Metropolis